Lofthus may refer to:

Places
Lofthus, Vestland, a village in Ullensvang municipality in Vestland county, Norway
Lofthus, Oslo, a borough in the city of Oslo in Norway

People
Anne Lofthus, a Norwegian ceramic artist and art teacher
Christian Jensen Lofthuus, a prominent farmer from Risør, Norway
Hege Lofthus, the former president of EGTYF (European Good Templar Youth Federation)
Herbrand Lofthus, a Norwegian wrestler who competed in the Olympics
Torstein Lofthus, a Norwegian drummer and composer

Other
Lofthus (shipwreck), a Norwegian shipwreck (which sank in 1898) near Boynton Beach, Florida, United States